Caswell Ellis Henican (February 10, 1905 – February 23, 1997) was a lawyer and an athlete for the Tulane Green Wave. As a football, basketball, and baseball player he was inducted into the Tulane Athletics Hall of Fame. He won the Porter Cup. He played as a running back on the football team. He is the father of Peggy Wilson.

References

External links

1905 births
1997 deaths
20th-century American lawyers
Tulane Green Wave football players
Tulane Green Wave men's basketball players
Tulane Green Wave baseball players
Players of American football from Louisiana
Basketball players from Louisiana
American football running backs
American men's basketball players